Queen Marie Louise Coidavid (1778 – 11 March 1851), was the Queen of the Kingdom of Haiti 1811–20 as the spouse of Henri Christophe.

Early life 
Marie-Louise was born into a free black family; her father was the owner of Hotel de la Couronne, Cap-Haïtien. Henri Christophe was a slave purchased by her father. Supposedly, he earned enough money in tips from his duties at the hotel that he was able to purchase his freedom before the Haitian Revolution. They married in Cap-Haïtien in 1793, having had a relationship with him from the year prior. They had four children: François Ferdinand (born 1794), Françoise-Améthyste (d. 1831), Athénaïs (d. 1839) and Victor-Henri.

At her spouse's new position in 1798, she moved to the Sans-Souci Palace. During the French invasion, she and her children lived underground until 1803.

Queen 
In 1811, Marie-Louise was given the title of queen upon the creation of the Kingdom of Haiti. Her new status gave her ceremonial tasks to perform, ladies-in-waiting, a secretary and her own court. She took her position seriously, and stated that the title "given to her by the nation" also gave her responsibilities and duties to perform. She served as the hostess of the ceremonial royal court life performed at the Sans-Souci Palace. She did not involve herself in the affairs of state. She was given the position of Regent should her son succeed her spouse while still being a minor.  However, as her son became of age before the death of his father, this was never to materialize.

After the death of the king in 1820, she remained with her daughters Améthyste and Athénaïs at the palace until they were escorted from it by his followers together with his corpse; after their departure, the palace was attacked and plundered. Marie-Louise and her daughters were given the property Lambert outside Cap. She was visited by president Jean Pierre Boyer, who offered her his protection; he denied the spurs of gold she gave him, stating that he was the leader of poor people. They were allowed to settle in Port-au-Prince. Marie-Louise was described as calm and resigned, but her daughters, especially Athénaïs, were described as vengeful.

Exile 
The Queen was in exile for 30 years. In August 1821, the former queen left Haiti with her daughters under the protection of the British admiral Sir Home Popham, and travelled to London. There were rumours that she was searching for the money, three million, deposited by her spouse in Europe. Whatever the case, she did live the rest of her life without economic difficulties. The English climate and pollution during the Industrial Revolution was determintal to Améthyste's health, and eventually they decided to leave.

In 1831, Marie-Louise and her daughters moved in Pisa in Italy, where they lived for the rest of their lives, Améthyste dying shortly after their arrival and Athénaïs in 1839. They lived discreetly for the most part, but were occasionally bothered by fortune hunters and throne claimers who wanted their fortune. Shortly before her death, she wrote to Haiti for permission to return. She never did, however, before she died in Italy.

See also 
 Marie-Claire Heureuse Félicité
 Adélina Lévêque

References

External links 
 https://web.archive.org/web/20100211132154/http://www.haitiwebs.com/archive/index.php/t-44102.html

1778 births
1851 deaths
Haitian royal consorts
Christophe family
Haitian Roman Catholics
19th-century Haitian people
People of the Haitian Revolution
Women of the Haitian Revolution
People from Nord-Est (department)
Nobility of the Americas